Talad Bang Yai station is a station on the Purple Line of the Bangkok MRT, located in Bang Yai, Nonthaburi Province. The station connects to CentralPlaza WestGate.

External links

Talad Bang Yai station

MRT (Bangkok) stations
Bangkok Yai district
Railway stations opened in 2016
2016 establishments in Thailand